The DST Group Building, also known as the DST Tower, was constructed in 1994. It is one of the tallest buildings in Brunei. The building's only tenant is the DataStream Technology Group, a leading telecommunications provider in the country. The building houses offices, recording studios and an open-air sky lobby on the fifteenth floor.

References

See also
List of towers

Office buildings in Brunei
Office buildings completed in 1995